Kaysone Phomvihane Thought is a political ideology that builds upon Marxism–Leninism and Ho Chi Minh Thought with the political philosophy developed by Kaysone Phomvihane, the first leader of the Communist Lao People's Revolutionary Party (LPRP). It was first formalised by the LPRP at its 10th National Congress, held in 2016. The ideology includes views on the basic issues of the Laotian Revolution, specifically the application and development of Marxism–Leninism to the material conditions of Laos. The contents of Kaysone Phomvihane Thought was codified and developed by the LPRP with help from the Communist Party of Vietnam.

See also 
 Mao Zedong Thought
 Xi Jinping Thought
 Ho Chi Minh Thought
 Kimilsungism-Kimjongilism

References

Sources

 

Lao People's Revolutionary Party
Communism in Laos
Types of socialism